Route 520 is the road which connects Kōloa and Poipū to Hawaii Route 50, the principal highway of the southern part of Kauai island in the state of Hawaii. It is under the jurisdiction of Kauai County, though it is numbered within the state numbering system.

Route description

Immediately south of where the road meets Route 50, the road (there known as Maluhia Road, meaning "peaceful") enters the Tunnel of Trees, a stand of Eucalyptus robusta, Swamp Mahogany. The stand, which lines either side of the road for more than a mile, providing shade and a characteristic smell. There are two versions of its planting. According to some, the trees were brought here and planted by the Knudsen family, at the time the largest landowner in the area to help stabilize the then soggy road over Knudsen Pass. Another story is that they were planted by pineapple baron Walter Duncan McBryde, who planted them as a community project in 1911, using 500 leftover trees from his landscaping of his estate at Kukuiolono. Before the construction of the Kaumualii Highway (Route 50), the tree tunnel was three times longer than its current size.

As Road 520 enters Kōloa, on the west side is the remains of the original Kōloa sugar mill, commemorated by a plaque and sculpture, erected in 1985 to commemorate the 150th anniversary of commercial sugar production in Hawaii.  The road forms a T with Kōloa Road at the center of Kōloa, and then continues to the south a few blocks further west under the name "Poipū Road." Kōloa Road continues west as Hawaii Route 530 continuing on south to Poipū. Poipū Road then splits off to the east to most of the town of Poipū. Route 520 then continues as Lāwai Road briefly, before it splits to the west leads to Spouting Horn and the National Tropical Botanical Gardens. The final stretch of the highway is marked as Hoonani Road, and terminates at Kōloa Landing.

History
The Maluhia Road section was formerly designated as Hawaii Route 52.

Major intersections

See also

 List of highways numbered 520

References

External links

 Route log

Transportation in Kauai County, Hawaii
 0520